Stanislas-Louis Bernier (21 February 1845 – 2 February 1919) was a French architect.

Biography 
Born in Paris, Bernier entered the École Nationale Supérieure des Beaux-Arts in 1864 as a student of Honoré Daumet. Twice a finalist in the competition for the Prix de Rome, he won the first grand prize in 1872 for a natural history museum project. He stayed at the Académie de France in Rome from 1873 to 1877. The principal design he sent from Rome consisted of an ambitious restoration of the Mausoleum at Halicarnassus (1877).

Back in Paris in 1878, he joined the government bureaucracy as an architect for the Conseil Général des Bâtiments Civils. He succeeded Georges-Ernest Coquart as the architect of the École des Beaux-Arts in 1890. In addition to maintaining the buildings erected by Félix Duban between 1832 and 1864, he also built there a monument to Duban which paraphrased Duban's architectural style.

Bernier's major work is the Opéra-Comique theatre, the Salle Favart, which needed to be rebuilt following an 1887 fire. He obtained the commission by winning a competition judged by five winners of the Grand Prix de Rome (including Charles Garnier), which ensured the design would reflect academic and official tastes. Because of disputes within the profession, more avant-garde architects did not participate. Built from 1893 to 1898, the theatre is typical Beaux-Arts architecture. The facade is an adaptation of Garnier's design for the Opéra, and the elaborate exterior and interior decoration shows the influence of both Garnier and Daumet.

In 1898, Bernier was elected to the Académie des Beaux-Arts (in seat number 3 of the architecture section). He led an official workshop of the École des Beaux-Arts from 1905 to 1919 and was president of the Société Centrale des Architectes Français from 1911 to 1914.

Bernier died in Paris and is buried at Père-Lachaise Cemetery (68th division). A bibliophile, he bequeathed his collection of ancient works to the Musée Condé located at Chantilly, Oise.

His name was given to a square in Paris in the Batignolles district.

Main work 
 1893–1898: theatre of the Opéra-Comique, listed as a French Historical Monument in 1977.

Notes

Bibliography 
 Ayers, Andrew (2004). The Architecture of Paris. Stuttgart; London: Edition Axel Menges. .
 Mead, Christopher Curtis (1996). "Bernier, Stanislas-Louis", vol. 3, in The Dictionary of Art, edited by Jane Turner. London: Macmillan. . Also at Oxford Art Online (subscription required).
 Pénanrun, David de; Roux, François; Delaire, Edmond (1907). "BERNIER Stanislas-Louis",  in [https://books.google.com/books?id=nLQaAAAAYAAJ&pg=PR3 Les architectes élèves de l'École des Beaux-Arts (1793–1907)], 2nd edition. Librairie de la construction moderne.

External links 
 

1845 births
Architects from Paris
1919 deaths
19th-century French architects
20th-century French architects
École des Beaux-Arts alumni
Prix de Rome for architecture
Burials at Père Lachaise Cemetery